Chalai may refer to:

 Chalai, a name used in parts of Southern India and in Sri Lanka for fish called sardine
 Chalai, Sri Lanka, a place north of Mullaitivu
 Battle of Chalai, fought 2009 during the Sri Lankan civil war
 Chalai (Thessaly), a town of ancient Thessaly, Greece